Libníč is a municipality and village in České Budějovice District in the South Bohemian Region of the Czech Republic. It has about 500 inhabitants.

Administrative parts

The village of Jelmo is an administrative part of Libníč.

History
The first written mention of Libníč is from 1394. The next mention is from 1490, when it was part of the Hluboká estate owned by the Pernštejn family. From 1571 to 1801, silver was mined in several local adits, but after the peak in the 1580s, the mining slowly declined.

In 1681, the healing effects of the local spring of sulphite-iron water were discovered, and so in 1714 the construction of spa buildings began. The operation of the spa continued for 200 years until the spring died out, which was attributed to mining activities. Libníč became an independent municipality in 1785.

In the middle of the 19th century, the spa gradually began to decline, but Libníč remained a popular resort and several villas were built there. In 1923, the municipality changed its name from Libnič to Libníč. Between 1976 and 1990, Libníč was merged with Rudolfov.

Economy
In 2010, a photovoltaic power station was put into operation in the municipality.

Sights

In 1715, a Baroque castle and a chapel were built. The castle was extended and rebuilt into a spa building in 1770. In 1952 it was rebuilt into a retirement home. The chapel was rebuilt into the Church of the Holy Trinity in 1788, which has been a parish church since 1855.

Architecturally valuable are the villas built in the late 19th century. The landmark of the centre of Libníč is Bezdíček's villa, today used as the municipal office and a pub.

References

External links

Villages in České Budějovice District